Shashi Wadhwa (born. 20 July 1948) is the dean of All India Institute of Medical Sciences, New Delhi. Her major research interests are developmental neurobiology, quantitative morphology and electron microscopy. Her laboratory mainly focussed on the developing human brain.

Education 

Shashi received her graduate degree from Jabalpur Medical College (Madhya Pradesh) in 1970 and then joined the Department of Anatomy at AIIMS for postgraduate studies leading to MS and PhD.

Career 

Shashi worked till her retirement as Professor and eventually the Dean of the Department of Anatomy. She has taught and trained undergraduates and postgraduates of MSc, MS and PhD since 1972 at AIIMS. She has 67 international and 37 National Research Publications, 27 Chapters in books and has edited/co-edited 13 books and monographs.

Major research 

Her major research interests are:

 developmental neurobiology
 quantitative morphology and
 electron microscopy

Her laboratory has mainly focused on the developing human brain. The human spinal cord, visual pathway, cerebellar nuclei and the autonomic innervation of human urinary bladder have been studied to highlight the critical time periods during which these regions are susceptible to alterations in the micro-environment of the fetus that could result in related developmental abnormalities. The studies provided baseline data for comparison with pathological material and animal experiments as well as helped in better understanding of processes involved in the development of these regions at the molecular level.

Recognition 

Shashi, an elected fellow of the National Academy of Medical Sciences, has been recognized for her work with many awards and honors. She won the Shanti Swarup Bhatnagar Prize of CSIR in 1990 and the BK Bachhawat Lifetime Achievement Award in 2013.

She holds life memberships with:

 International Brain Research Organization
 Indian Group of International Society for Stereology
 Indian Academy of Neurosciences
 Electron microscopic Society of India
 Delhi Association of Morphological Sciences

She has been a member of the Indian Cancer Society since 1999.

References 

Articles created or expanded during Women's History Month (India) - 2014
1948 births
Living people
Indian women medical doctors
20th-century Indian medical doctors
Place of birth missing (living people)
Fellows of the National Academy of Medical Sciences
Academic staff of the All India Institute of Medical Sciences, New Delhi
Indian neuroscientists
Indian women neuroscientists
Medical doctors from Madhya Pradesh
Indian women medical researchers
20th-century Indian women scientists
Indian medical researchers
20th-century women physicians
Recipients of the Shanti Swarup Bhatnagar Award in Medical Science